A total solar eclipse will occur on September 23, 2071. A solar eclipse occurs when the Moon passes between Earth and the Sun, thereby totally or partly obscuring the image of the Sun for a viewer on Earth. A total solar eclipse occurs when the Moon's apparent diameter is larger than the Sun's, blocking all direct sunlight, turning day into darkness. Totality occurs in a narrow path across Earth's surface, with the partial solar eclipse visible over a surrounding region thousands of kilometres wide.

Related eclipses

Solar eclipses 2069–2072

Saros series 145

Inex series

Metonic series 
 All eclipses in this table occur at the Moon's ascending node.

Notes

References

2071 09 23
2071 in science
2071 09 23
2071 09 23